Major-General Fergus Alan Humphrey Ling,  (1914 – 7 May 1995) was a British Army officer.

Military career
Educated at Stowe School and the Royal Military College, Sandhurst, Ling was commissioned into the Queen's Royal Regiment (West Surrey) in December 1934. He commanded the 2/5th Battalion, Queen's Royal Regiment (West Surrey) at the crossing of the River Garigliano and the battles of the Gothic Line in 1944. After the war, he became commanding officer of the 5th Battalion, Queen's Royal Regiment (West Surrey) in 1954, commander of 148th Infantry Brigade in December 1958 and Deputy Adjutant General of the British Army of the Rhine in December 1961. He went on to be General Officer Commanding 54th (East Anglian) Division/District of the Territorial Army in May 1965 and GOC Eastern District in 1967 before he retired in February 1969.

He was honorary colonel of the Queen's Regiment from 1973 to 1977.

In retirement he managed a successful appeal on behalf of the National Trust to raise funds to acquire the Island of Lundy from the Harman family.

Family
In 1940, he married Sheelah Sarel; they had two sons and three daughters.

References

|-

1914 births
1995 deaths
British Army major generals
Companions of the Order of the Bath
Commanders of the Order of the British Empire
Companions of the Distinguished Service Order
Queen's Royal Regiment officers
British Army personnel of World War II
Deputy Lieutenants of Surrey
People educated at Stowe School
Graduates of the Royal Military College, Sandhurst